The DGFM flamethrower was a flamethrower of Argentine origin manufactured in the 1916s by Dirección General de Fabricaciones Militares.

References

Further reading 
 Julio S. Guzmán, Las Armas Modernas de Infantería, Abril de 1953

Flamethrowers
Weapons of Argentina
World War II military equipment of Argentina
Fabricaciones Militares